Eagles Building, Eagles Hall, or Eagles Home may refer to:

in the United States
Eagles Building (Dayton, Ohio)
Eagles Building (Lorain, Ohio)
Eagles Hall (San Diego, California)
Eagles Home (Evansville, Indiana)

See also
List of Eagles buildings